Nathan Gaunt is an Australian singer-songwriter. His debut EP, Nothingwomb, was released in 1999. His style is an eclectic mix of rock, pop, blues, and folk. Along with vocals, Gaunt plays a variety of instruments including the guitar and piano.

Early life
Gaunt was born in Darwin, Northern Territory, Australia. His family moved to Alice Springs in the Central Australian desert and later settled in the isolated city of Perth, Western Australia, where he was influenced by the diverse music scene.

Music career
According to Gaunt, the first musical instrument he played was the piano. He picked up his first guitar after seeing Jimi Hendrix play on late night TV.

Since 1999, Gaunt has released four EPs and four albums, including Headlights on the Hills. 2004's Escape and Return, which Gaunt co-produced with producer/engineer Jeremy Allom, contained the single Come Home. His most recent album is Halcyon Dazed which the Sydney Morning Herald said "channels the best of trip-hop, prog and alt-rock, soaring like some lost track from Radiohead's OK Computer." Regarding Gaunt, the newspaper also remarked that "Neil Finn might have some competition when it comes to crafting sadly beautiful valentines."

Gaunt has won a number of awards from the West Australian Music Industry Association (known as WAMi's), including "Best Male Vocalist" and "Best Guitarist."

He toured the United States for the first time in late 2007, with shows in Los Angeles, San Francisco, New York, Philadelphia and Washington, DC.

Discography

Albums

Extended plays

Awards

West Australian Music Industry Awards
The Western Australian Music Industry Awards (commonly known as WAMis) are annual awards presented to the local contemporary music industry, put on by the Western Australian Music Industry Association Inc (WAM). Gaunt has won seven awards.

 (wins only)
|-
|rowspan="2"| 2001
|rowspan="2"| Nathan Gaunt
| Most Popular Male Original Instrumentalist
| 
|-
| Most Popular Male Original Guitarist 
| 
|-
| 2002
| Nathan Gaunt and the Black Eyed Dogs
| Most Popular Local Original Blues Act 
| 
|-
|rowspan="2"| 2003
|rowspan="2"| Nathan Gaunt
| Most Popular Local Original Male Vocalist
| 
|-
| Most Popular Local Original Guitarist
| 
|-
|rowspan="2"| 2005
|rowspan="2"| Nathan Gaunt
| Best Male Vocalist
| 
|-
| Best Guitarist
| 
|-

References

External links
Official Artist website

Year of birth missing (living people)
Living people
Musicians from Perth, Western Australia
Australian songwriters
People from Darwin, Northern Territory
People from Alice Springs
Musicians from the Northern Territory